Lherzolite is a type of ultramafic igneous rock. It is a coarse-grained rock consisting of 40 to 90% olivine along with significant orthopyroxene and lesser amounts of calcic chromium-rich clinopyroxene. Minor minerals include chromium and aluminium spinels and garnets. Plagioclase can occur in lherzolites and other peridotites that crystallize at relatively shallow depths (20 – 30 km). At greater depth plagioclase is unstable and is replaced by spinel. At approximately 90 km depth, pyrope garnet becomes the stable aluminous phase. Garnet lherzolite is a major constituent of the Earth's upper mantle (extending to ~300 km depth). Lherzolite is known from  the lower ultramafic part of ophiolite complexes (although harzburgite is more common in this setting), from alpine-type peridotite massifs, from fracture zones adjacent to mid-oceanic ridges, and as xenoliths in kimberlite pipes and alkali basalts. Partial melting of spinel lherzolite is one of the primary sources of basaltic magma.

The name is derived from its type locality, the Lherz Massif (an alpine peridotite complex, also known as orogenic lherzolite complex), at Étang de Lers, near Massat in the French Pyrenees; Étang de Lherz is the archaic spelling of this location.

The Lherz massif also contains harzburgite and dunite, as well as layers of spinel pyroxenite, garnet pyroxenite, and hornblendite. The layers represent partial melts extracted from the host peridotite during decompression in the mantle long before emplacement into the crust.

The Lherz massif is unique because it has been emplaced into Paleozoic carbonates (limestones and dolomites), which form mixed breccias of limestone-lherzolite around the margins of the massif.

The Moon’s lower mantle may be composed of lherzolite.

References

 Blatt, Harvey and Robert J. Tracy, 1996, Petrology: Igneous, Sedimentary and Metamorphic, 2nd ed., Freeman, 

Ultramafic rocks